Darcy Conyers (1919–1973) was a British screenwriter, actor, producer and film director. He is sometimes credited as D'Arcy Conyers.

He was the founder and creator of Bistro Vino in South Kensington, London, in 1964 -  possibly the first casual dining restaurant in London. He also opened The Reject China Shop in Beauchamp Place, London SW3.

Selected filmography
Actor
 Bond Street (1948)
 The Jack of Diamonds (1949)
 Golden Arrow (1949)
 Trottie True (1949)
 Ha'penny Breeze (1950)
 Wings of Danger (1952)
 The Time of His Life (1955)
 The Blue Peter (1955)

Director
 The Secret of the Forest (1956)
 The Devil's Pass (1957)
 The Night We Dropped a Clanger (1959)
 The Night We Got the Bird (1961)
 Nothing Barred (1961)
 In the Doghouse (1962)

References

External links

1919 births
1973 deaths
British male screenwriters
British film directors
British male film actors
British film producers
20th-century British male actors
20th-century British screenwriters
20th-century British businesspeople